Chang Woe-ryong (born April 5, 1959) is a South Korean football coach and a former international player who represented his country in the 1980 AFC Asian Cup.

Playing career
Chang Woe-Ryong started his career as an amateur footballer for Yonsei University and was deemed good enough to represent his country in the 1980 AFC Asian Cup where he was part of the team that came runners-up to Kuwait. In 1982 Chang would officially start his semi-professional football career when he joined Daewoo Royals and became one of the first South Korean players in the new professionalized 1983 K League. By the following season the club had become a fully professional unit and Chang would show himself to be an assured left-back as the club won the 1984 K League title. The following seasons would then see Daewoo Royals as one of the dominating teams within the league, which saw Chang gain a 1985 AFC Champions League medal and another league title before he had to retire through injury. By 1989 Chang had already moved into coaching until Japanese football club Tosu Futures briefly brought him out of retirement as a player-coach.

Coaching career
He was confirmed as permanent manager of Incheon United in January 2005, after taking over as caretaker manager in September 2004 following the resignation of Werner Lorant. Chang spent the whole of 2007 studying in England, and Park Lee-Chun took temporary charge of Incheon United for the year.

Chang returned to take charge of Incheon United prior to the start of the 2008 season.

On 10 December 2008, J. League club Omiya Ardija announced they signed a contract with Chang as head coach until 2010.

On 17 December 2015, Chang accepted the invitation of Chinese Super League side Chongqing Lifan with three-year contract. The reason which he chose Chongqing Lifan was the Provisional Government of the Republic of Korea based in Chongqing during the Japanese Korean period.

In April 2018, Henan Jianye signed Chang. He was sacked in September as the team performance was below expectation.

On 18 December 2019, Chang was appointed by Chongqing Dangdai Lifan for the second time.

International goals
Results list South Korea's goal tally first.

Managerial statistics

Honours

As a player
Club

Daewoo Royals
K League Classic: 1984, 1987
AFC Champions League: 1985

Country
AFC Asian Cup runner-up: 1980

Individual
K League Best XI: 1983, 1985

As a coach
Club

Busan Daewoo Royals
K League Classic runner-up: 1999

Incheon United
K League Classic runner-up: 2005

Individual
K League Manager of the Year Award: 2005

References

External links
 

1959 births
Living people
People from Goheung County
Sportspeople from South Jeolla Province
South Korean footballers
Association football defenders
Yonsei University alumni
Busan IPark players
Sagan Tosu players
K League 1 players
South Korea international footballers
1980 AFC Asian Cup players
South Korean expatriate footballers
South Korean expatriate sportspeople in Japan
Expatriate footballers in Japan
South Korean football managers
Sagan Tosu managers
Busan IPark managers
Tokyo Verdy managers
Hokkaido Consadole Sapporo managers
Incheon United FC managers
Omiya Ardija managers
Qingdao Hainiu F.C. (1990) managers
Dalian Professional F.C. managers
Chongqing Liangjiang Athletic F.C. managers
Henan Songshan Longmen F.C. managers
K League 1 managers
J1 League managers
J2 League managers
Chinese Super League managers
South Korean expatriate football managers
South Korean expatriate sportspeople in China
Expatriate football managers in Japan
Expatriate football managers in China